The 2022–23 Colgate Raiders men's basketball team represents Colgate University in the 2022–23 NCAA Division I men's basketball season. The Raiders, led by 12th-year head coach Matt Langel, play their home games at Cotterell Court in Hamilton, New York as members of the Patriot League. They finished the season 23–8, 17–1 in Patriot League play to finish as regular season champions for the third consecutive year. As the No. 1 seed, they defeated Loyola (MD), Army, and Lafayette to win the Patriot League tournament. They received the conference’s automatic bid to the NCAA tournament for the third consecutive year. As the No. 15 seed in the Midwest Region, they lost in the first round of the NCAA Tournament to Texas, finishing their season with an overall record of 26–9.

Previous season
The Raiders finished the 2021–22 season 23–12, 16–2 in Patriot League play to finish atop the North Division. In the Patriot League tournament, they defeated Bucknell in the quarterfinals, Lehigh in the semifinals, advancing to the championship game for the fifth consecutive year. There, they defeated Navy, earning the Patriot League's automatic berth into the NCAA tournament. They drew the #14 seed in the Midwest Region, where they would lose to No. 3 seed Wisconsin in the first round.

Roster

Schedule and results

|-
!colspan=12 style=| Non-conference regular season

|-
!colspan=12 style=| Patriot League regular season

|-
!colspan=9 style=| Patriot League tournament

|-
!colspan=12 style=}| NCAA tournament

Sources

References

Colgate Raiders men's basketball seasons
Colgate Raiders
Colgate Raiders men's basketball
Colgate Raiders men's basketball
Colgate